Lieutenant junior grade is a junior commissioned officer rank used in a number of navies.

United States

Lieutenant (junior grade), commonly abbreviated as LTJG or, historically, Lt. (j.g.) (as well as variants of both abbreviations), is a junior commissioned officer rank of the United States Navy, the United States Coast Guard, the United States Public Health Service Commissioned Corps, and the National Oceanic and Atmospheric Administration Commissioned Officer Corps (NOAA Corps). LTJG has a US military pay grade of O-2, and a NATO rank code of OF-1. The rank is also used in the United States Maritime Service. The NOAA Corps's predecessors, the United States Coast and Geodetic Survey Corps (1917–1965) and the Environmental Science Services Administration Corps or ESSA Corps (1965–1970), also used the rank.

Lieutenant (junior grade), ranks above ensign and below lieutenant and is equivalent to a first lieutenant in the other uniformed services (the Army, Marine Corps, Air Force, and Space Force) and sub-lieutenant in the Royal Navy and the navies of many Commonwealth countries.

Promotion to LTJG is governed by Department of Defense policies derived from the Defense Officer Personnel Management Act of 1980. DOPMA guidelines suggest all "fully qualified" ensigns should be promoted to LTJG. The time for promotion to LTJG is a minimum of two years after commissioning in the Navy or 18 months in the Coast Guard. Lieutenants, junior grade typically lead petty officers and non-rated personnel, unless assigned to small aircraft or on staff duty. A LTJG's usual shipboard billet is as a division officer.

Lieutenant, junior grade is often referred to colloquially as JG. Prior to March 3, 1883, this rank was known in the U.S. Navy as master.

Notable LTJGs

 Neil Armstrong, Korean War naval aviator and astronaut, Commander of Apollo 11 
 Francis Bellotti, Former Massachusetts Attorney General, served in World War II
 Paul Brown, Football coach & executive, spent WW2 as coach of Great Lakes Navy Bluejackets 
 George H. W. Bush, WW2 naval aviator and 41st President of the United States
 Albert David, only Atlantic Fleet sailor awarded the Medal of Honor in World War II
 Kirk Douglas, American actor, served in WW2
 Henry Fonda, American film and stage actor, served in WW2
 L. Ron Hubbard, science fiction writer and founder of Scientology, served in WW2
 John F. Kennedy, WW2 PT boat CO and 35th President of the United States
 Bob Kerrey, Navy SEAL Medal of Honor recipient and U.S. Senator
 Brian Lamb, Founder of C-SPAN, PAO during the Vietnam era.
 Harvey Milk, gay rights activist and San Francisco Board Supervisor, served in Korea
 Thomas R. Norris, Navy SEAL and Medal of Honor recipient
 David Robinson, Naval Academy graduate, NBA Hall of Fame player
 Potter Stewart, SCOTUS associate justice, served in WW2
 Malcolm Wilson, New York politician, served in WW2
 William Sylvester White, Illinois Appellate Court justice, member of the Golden Thirteen

Gallery

See also
 Comparative military ranks
 U.S. Navy officer rank insignia

References

Military ranks of the United States Navy
Military ranks of the United States Coast Guard
Naval ranks